The 2018 Indian Super League Final was a football match between Bengaluru and Chennaiyin, played on 17 March 2018, at the Sree Kanteerava Stadium in Bangalore. The match was a culmination of the 2017–18 Indian Super League season, the fourth season of one of the top professional football leagues in India. Chennaiyin won the match, defeating Bengaluru 3–2. Hero of the Match Maílson Alves scored a brace for Chennaiyin while Raphael Augusto scored their third goal. Bengaluru's Sunil Chhetri originally gave his side the lead with his ninth minute goal while Miku scored their consolation in second half stoppage-time.

Chennaiyin managed to qualify for the finals after finishing in second during the regular season. They then defeated Goa over two legs, 4–1, in the semi-finals. Bengaluru qualified for the finals after finishing at the top of the regular season table. They then defeated Pune City during the semi-finals tie, 3–1. Prior to the finals, Chennaiyin and Bengaluru played each other twice during the season, with both sides winning the away fixtures against each other.

The championship was Chennaiyin's second, after they won the 2015 final. This was Bengaluru's first time in the final in what was only their first season in the Indian Super League. As the winner of the championship, Chennaiyin earned a berth into the 2019 AFC Cup qualifiers.it was a thriller with one late goal

Background 
This was Bengaluru's first season in the Indian Super League and also their first appearance in the finals. Meanwhile Chennaiyin made their second appearance in the Indian Super League finals. 

Sunil Chhetri scored the fastest goal in an Indian Super League final in 8 minutes 5 seconds.

Maílson Alves was named the man of the match for scoring two goals.

Match

References

External links
 Indian Super League Official Website.

Indian Super League finals
2017–18 Indian Super League season
2017–18 in Indian football
Indian Super League Final
Bengaluru FC matches
Chennaiyin FC matches